Third-party verification (TPV) is a process of getting an independent party to confirm that the customer is actually requesting a change or ordering a new service or product. By putting the customer on the phone (usually via transfer or 3-way call) the TPV provider asks a customer for his or her identity, that he or she is an authorized decision maker and to confirm the order.

Who uses
In many parts of the world, especially the United States, long distance providers, telemarketing companies are required by law to use a third-party verification service while selling products or services over the phone or they may face substantial penalties or criminal sanction. Merchants who take electronic check payments over the phone are required to receive either written or voice recorded authorizations; or anyone else who wants to have third-party  companies, lawyers, appointment setting, schools and universities, utility companies, telecom companies, Internet service providers, security companies, auto dealers service departments, summer camps, healthcare and hospitals, real estate, travel and vacation, and many more.

A TPV provider allows companies to prove that a consumer agreed to almost any kind of sale or other transaction, using either email or telephone or both, and obtain a legally binding instrument in the process.

TPV is required
TPV is required or authorized by the Federal Trade Commission and most state's public utility or Public Services Commissions for telecom service changes and by many states for changes in electric and natural gas service.

In addition, the FTC requires a process similar to TPV for many orders and to have reliable documentation of their orders, and other transaction types. Third-party verification is now the de facto standard for transactions of all types where a legally binding authentication and confirmation are required, but a signed document is impractical or impossible. It is being applied in hospitals and elsewhere in healthcare for records releases; in schools for parental program approvals; by local governments as notification of impending actions; by attorneys themselves for service authorizations; by service providers for work authorizations. In all cases, based upon Federal Rules and the U.S.Code, phone verifications are authorized and legally binding, assuming that the verification is recorded and available for audit for a minimum of 24 months, and that identity of the authorizing person can reasonably be verified, such as by a social security number, driver's license, date of birth or other unique identifiers.

In the telecommunications industry, under new rules, VoIP carriers who connect with the public telephone network are required to notify their customers of any limitations to their E911 (enhanced 911) service, including where and under what conditions it may not be available, such as a loss of internet connection, or loss of power. Importantly, VoIP carriers must also obtain "affirmative acknowledgement" from every customer that they have received and understood that information.

Thus phone verification fills the demand for legal authentication of documents, consumer intent, and provides substantial fraud prevention.

Advantages of using
Third-party verification adds an important element of proof to electronic transactions. For example, in a just-completed experimental study of consumer reactions to electronic contracts, over 80% of respondents agreed that a transaction was harder to dispute because the verification was made and held by an independent third party.

However, the actual telemarketing sales calls leading to third-party verification are typically not retained. Given this, marketing abuses are often difficult to identify, even with the use of third-party verification.

Currently, TPV elements are used in complex verification and approval of different web transactions in conjunction with address verification services provided by credit card companies, IP geolocation, phone type identifying (land line, mobile, VoIP etc.).

References

Telemarketing